Count On Me (Korean: 믿어줄래) is the first extended play by Korean-American singer, Jay Park. The album was released in digital and physical format by July 13, 2010. The EP is a rendition of B.o.B's hit song "Nothin' on You", which Park made a cover of on YouTube.

Background
Back in March 2010, Park made a cover of the original song by B.o.B in his bathroom and released it on his old YouTube account. It was the first apparition by Park since the MySpace controversy and his contract termination with JYPE. The video went viral and reached over 2,000,000 views in less than 24 hours. In Korea, the original song by B.o.B and Bruno Mars topped the Cyworld background music chart in a matter of hours upon the video's release, beating Girls' Generation's song "Run Devil Run" that was released the following day.

Park released a duet single of "Nothin' on You" with B.o.B, where he replaces Bruno Mars' vocals. Warner Music Korea explained that Park's featuring was made possible by music distribution company, Warner Music America's Asian counterpart, SEA, as well as his YouTube cover contributing to much of the song's success in Korea with more than 5 million hits.

Park then released his own version of the song under Vitamin Entertainment, a subsidiary of Warner Music Korea, with the approval of the original writer. Renowned composer Park Geun Tae, who was a part of the production, revealed that the song has a newly added melody and style to fit Park's characteristics. The English and Korean lyrics were written by Park himself. The full EP was released on July 13, 2010.

Music video
Park released a short music video of the song on his old YouTube channel on July 13, 2010. Warner Music Korea also released the short music video on YouTube on their channel on March 30, 2011.

Track listing

Chart performance 
The single album sold 21,989 physical copies on the first day of release, coming in at #1 in sales and #7 in the overall ranking of albums released from January 2010 to July 13, 2010. With more than 41,316 copies sold at the end of 2010 making the album place at #32 on Gaon's year end chart, Park earned approximately 700 million won from his single album, which placed him at #3 in the overall annual ranking of album released until at the end of July 2010.

Album chart

Single chart

Sales and certifications

References

External links
 Official website
  at SidusHQ 
 'Count On Me' EP on Warner Music Korea's official website
 
 

Jay Park albums
2011 EPs
Hip hop EPs
Korean-language EPs